Markhamia zanzibarica, also known as bell bean tree or maroon bell-bean, is a species of plant in the family Bignoniaceae. It is found in East Africa and Southern Africa, from Kenya to South Africa.

Description
This species usually grows as small tree, and thrives in areas that are lightly forested, such as fields. It is known to grow in riverine fringes and rocky outcrops. Flowers are yellow. The fruit is a long capsule.

References

External links

Tree Atlas of Namibia -  Markhamia zanzibarica

Flora of Angola
Flora of Kenya
Flora of Mozambique
Flora of Namibia
Flora of Tanzania
Flora of Zambia
Flora of Zimbabwe
zanzibarica
Plants described in 1894
Taxa named by Wenceslas Bojer
Taxa named by Augustin Pyramus de Candolle
Taxa named by Karl Moritz Schumann